The butter cow has been an Iowa State Fair staple since 1911, when J.K. Daniels created the first cow. The popular exhibition, which consists of hundreds of pound of local butter applied to a wood and metal wireframe, is showcased in the coolers of the fairground's Agricultural Building.

History

The Iowa State Fair butter cow has had just five sculptors in its more-than 110-year history. Daniels was succeeded by J.E. Wallace, a sculptor and taxidermist, who also created butter sculptures for state fairs nationwide, including Florida, New York, and Texas. Wallace sculpted the State Fair's butter cows for 36 years until his death in 1956. Earl Frank Dutt was the butter cow's official sculptor from 1957–1959

Norma "Duffy" Lyon petitioned fair officials to become sculptor for the 1960 Iowa State Fair; she would go on to have the longest tenure, sculpting the fair's butter cows and companion sculptures for the next 45 years. Lyon was succeeded in 2006 by Sarah Pratt, her apprentice of 15 years.

Pratt is State Fair's butter cow sculptor as of 2022.

Companion sculptures

In 1994, Lyon won the fair's approval to create her first butter sculpture of a living person, country music singer Garth Brooks. Subsequent companion butter sculptures paid tribute to famous people, as well as historical, cultural, and current events., including entertainers Elvis Presley and John Wayne; athletes Tiger Woods and Olympic gymnast Shawn Johnson; a Harley-Davidson motorcycle, for the manufacturer's 100th anniversary; Grant Wood's American Gothic and Leonardo da Vinci's The Last Supper; and the 50th anniversaries of Star Trek and Sesame Street.

References

Culture of Des Moines, Iowa
Iowa State Fair
Lists of sculptures
Butter